Associazione Calcio Milan are an Italian professional football club based in Milan, Lombardy, who currently play in Serie A. This chronological list comprises all those who have held the position of manager or technical director (i.e. a manager who has exceeded the age limit, currently set at 65, and is only allowed to manage a professional club if joined by a qualified manager) of the first team of Milan since their foundation in 1899. Each manager's entry includes the seasons he spent at the club, the team's overall competitive record (in terms of matches won, drawn and lost) and honours won during his tenure. Caretaker managers are included, as well as those who have been in permanent charge.

The most successful person to manage Milan is Nereo Rocco, who won two Serie A titles, three Coppa Italia, two European Cups, two Cup Winners' Cups and one Intercontinental Cup during his tenures as head coach and technical director. Rocco has also been Milan's longest-serving manager, managing the club for 459 matches (323 as head coach and 136 as technical director) in five different spells between 1961 and 1977. Milan's longest-serving manager over a single time-span is, instead, Carlo Ancelotti, whose tenure lasted seven years and 236 days, from 6 November 2001 to 30 June 2009.

List of managers 
Statistics correct as of match played 13 March 2023. Only competitive matches are counted.

Most appearances

Trophies

Notes

References 
General

Specific

External links 
Managers at MagliaRossonera.it 

 
Managers
Milan
Managers